Mimonephelotus flavomarmoratus is a species of beetle in the family Cerambycidae, and the only species in the genus Mimonephelotus. It was described by Breuning in 1940.

References

Lamiini
Beetles described in 1940